Guillermo José Zavaleta Rojas (19 March 1976 – 3 September 2010) was a Mexican politician from the National Action Party. From 2009 to 2012 he served as Deputy of the LXI Legislature of the Mexican Congress representing Guanajuato.

On 3 September 2010 Zavaleta and a fellow Deputy, Juan Huerta Montero, died on a plane crash near the Bahías de Huatulco International Airport.

References

1976 births
2010 deaths
People from Oaxaca
National Action Party (Mexico) politicians
Victims of aviation accidents or incidents in Mexico
21st-century Mexican politicians
Deputies of the LXI Legislature of Mexico
Members of the Chamber of Deputies (Mexico) for Guanajuato